Gilles Guillain (born 11 May 1982) is a Colombian-born French actor.

His breakthrough role was in the film, Brief Crossing in 2001.

Filmography

External links
 
 Official site

French male film actors
1982 births
Living people